L'étoile is an opéra bouffe in three acts by Emmanuel Chabrier with a libretto by Eugène Leterrier and Albert Vanloo.

Chabrier met his librettists at the home of a mutual friend, the painter Gaston Hirsh, in 1875. Chabrier played to them early versions of the romance "O petite étoile" and the ensemble "Le pal, est de tous les supplices..." (with words by Verlaine which Leterrier and Vanloo found too bold and toned down). They agreed to collaborate and Chabrier set about composition with enthusiasm.
The story echoes some of the characters and situations of Chabrier's Fisch-Ton-Kan.

Performance history 
L'étoile premiered on 28 November 1877 at Offenbach's Théâtre des Bouffes Parisiens. In its initial run the modest orchestra was appalled at the difficulty of Chabrier’s score, which was much more sophisticated than anything Offenbach wrote for the small boulevard theatre.

It was first performed outside France in Berlin on 4 October 1878, then in Budapest on 23 November 1878.  In New York City in 1890 at the Broadway Theatre, an English adaptation by J. Cheever Goodwin was titled The Merry Monarch, with new music by Woolson Morse. Chabrier's music fared no better in London in 1899, where the score was rewritten by Ivan Caryll for an adaptation at the Savoy Theatre called The Lucky Star.  In Brussels in 1909, Chabrier's music was restored, and there was a performance at the Arts Décoratifs Exposition in Paris in 1925, conducted by Albert Wolff.

The operetta's first major revival was on 10 April 1941 at the Opéra-Comique in Paris under Nazi occupation, with Fanély Revoil, René Hérent, Lillie Grandval and André Balbon, at which time highlights were recorded, conducted by Roger Désormière; this production was revived in December 1946 with Revoil and Payen. New productions were mounted at the Opéra-Comique in October 1984 with Colette Alliot-Lugaz and Michel Sénéchal in leading roles, and in December 2007 with Jean-Luc Viala and Stéphanie d’Oustrac.

The first complete recording, by EMI in 1985, conducted by John Eliot Gardiner, followed a production at the Opéra National de Lyon the previous year starring Alliot-Lugaz, which was also filmed for television by FR3 in November 1985 and broadcast in 1986.

L'étoile has been performed with increasing frequency and further afield over recent years, with productions at Opera North in 1991, Glimmerglass and Maastricht in 2001, New York City Opera in 2003 (revived in March 2010), Toronto in 2005, Montreal and Cincinnati in 2006, Zurich in 2007 and Geneva in 2009. In 2010 it was performed at the Austin Lyric Opera, Texas, the Berlin State Opera (conducted by Simon Rattle) and Theater Bielefeld. A production by David Alden has been mounted in repertory at Frankfurt Opera in 2010 and 2011. New Sussex Opera staged a touring production in Sussex and London in English, as Lucky Star, in 2013 (conducted by Nicholas Jenkins).

The opera was part of the Dutch National Opera's 2014/15 season in October 2014. The Royal Opera (London) gave several performances in early 2016, the first at that house.

Roles
  Source: Delage

Synopsis

Act 1 
King Ouf 1er roams his city, in disguise, searching for a suitable subject to execute as a birthday treat. Hérisson de Porc-Epic, an ambassador, and his wife, Aloès, arrive, accompanied by his secretary, Tapioca, and Laoula, the daughter of a neighboring monarch. They are traveling incognito, and the princess is being passed off as Hérisson's wife. Their mission, of which Laoula is unaware, is to marry her to Ouf. Complications arise when Laoula and a poor peddler, Lazuli, fall in love at first sight. Scolded for flirting, Lazuli insults the disguised king and thus becomes a desired candidate for death by impalement. But Siroco, the king's astrologer, reveals that the fates of the king and the peddler are inextricably linked; the stars predict that they will die within 24 hours of each other. Fortunes change again, and Lazuli is escorted with honors into the palace.

Act 2 
Lazuli, feted and well fed, grows bored with luxury and longs for Laoula. Ouf, still unaware of the disguises, furthers the lovers' hopes of marriage by imprisoning the supposed husband, Hérisson. The lovers depart but Hérisson escapes and orders the peddler to be shot. Gunfire is heard, but although Laoula is brought in there is no sign of Lazuli. Ouf bemoans his impending death.

Act 3 
Lazuli, having escaped harm, overhears Ouf, Siroco and Hérisson discussing the situation, and eventually reveals himself to Laoula. They plan a second elopement. The king and Siroco try to raise their spirits with a large glass of green chartreuse. Ouf, desperate to produce an heir to the throne, plans to marry Laoula, even if for an hour, but finds that he has run out of time. However, when the clocks strike five and nothing happens, Ouf declares that the astrologer's predictions must have been wrong. The Chief of Police then appears with Lazuli, who was caught on his way out of the country. The King blesses Lazuli and Laoula's marriage. In a general final chorus Lazuli and Laoula address the audience to a reprise of act 1 finale.

References
Notes

Sources
Delage, Roger, Emmanuel Chabrier. Paris: Fayard, 1999.

External links
 Vocal score
L'étoile Libretto, 1877 (in French)

French-language operas
Operas
Operas by Emmanuel Chabrier
Opéras bouffes
1877 operas